Access code may refer to:

Authentication 
 Password, a secret word
 Personal identification number (PIN), a secret

Telecommunications 
 Trunk access code, used to dial a domestic call
 International access code, used to dial an international call
 Area code, a segment of a telephone number

Other
Access Code (film), a 1984 film with Macdonald Carey